The Revere Fire Hall, on 2nd St. in Revere, Minnesota, was built around 1900.  It was listed on the National Register of Historic Places in 1980.

It is a small building with a false front.  It has a square bell tower with a flagpole.  It is located on a side street but near the center of Revere, about half a block from the new fire station built in 1974.

It is representative of common, specialized municipal buildings.

References

Fire stations on the National Register of Historic Places in Minnesota
National Register of Historic Places in Redwood County, Minnesota
Infrastructure completed in 1900